The Lemko Region is an ethnographic area in southern Poland that has traditionally been inhabited by the Lemko people. In the East, the region is described as either terminating linguistically between the Wisłok River Wisłok and Osława Rivers, or ethnographically at the Sanok River (depending on the author), where it meets the Boyko region. Some even go so far as to consider it to extend south into the Prešov Region, Slovakia.

Previously a frontier area under the nominal control of Great Moravia, the Lemko Region became part of Poland in medieval Piast times. It was made part of the Austrian province of Galicia due to the First Partition of Poland in 1772. Parts were briefly independent under the Lemko-Rusyn Republic and Komancza Republic, and later annexed to Poland.

Most Lemkos in Poland were deported from their ancestral region as part of Operation Vistula in 1946, and only a small part of them remains there today, the rest being scattered across the Recovered Territories.

The landscape is typical of medium-height-mountain terrain, with ridges reaching  and sometimes . Only small parts of the southern Low Beskids and the northern San river region have a low-mountain landscape. Even so, the region still occupies some of the lowest elevations in the Carpathians: most of the Low Beskids, the western part of the Middle Beskids, and the eastern fringe of the Western Beskids. Conversely, it also includes much of the higher elevations of the Carpathians within modern-day Poland, which extend approximately to the Poprad River in the west (see: Ruś Szlachtowska). A series of mountain passes along the Torysa River and Poprad River (Tylych Pass ; Dukla Pass, ; and Łupków Pass) facilitate communication between Galician and Transcarpathian Lemkos.

Publications
"Łemkowie Grupa Etniczna czy Naród"?, [The Lemkos: An Ethnic Group or a Nation?], trans. 
"The Lemkos of Poland" - Articles and Essays, editor Paul Best and Jarosław Moklak
"The Lemko Region, 1939–1947 War, Occupation and Deportation" - Articles and Essays, editor Paul Best and Jarosław Moklak,  (avail. from: Inter-Ed, Inc, New Haven, CT)

See also
Muzeum Budownictwa Ludowego w Sanoku
Lemko-Rusyn Republic
Komancza Republic
Operation Vistula

References

External links
SFULO - World federation of Ukrainian Lemko Unions
LEMKY.COM - Lemkos Portal
Magazine "Lemkivshchyna"
lemko.org

Eastern Carpathians
Geography of Slovakia
Regions of Poland
Historical regions in Slovakia
History of Galicia (Eastern Europe)
 
Rusyn communities